Combermere can refer to:
Combermere Abbey, Cheshire, England
Combermere Park, Cheshire, England
Combermere, Cheshire, a village in Cheshire, England
Combermere House, Nantwich, a listed building in Nantwich, Cheshire
Comber Mere, a lake in the park of Combermere Abbey, Cheshire, England
Combermere, Ontario, a town in eastern Ontario, Canada
Combermere School, Barbados
Combermere Barracks, a British Army barracks near Windsor Castle
Viscount Combermere, a title in the Peerage of the United Kingdom